The 1998–1999 Úrvalsdeild kvenna was the 41st season of the Úrvalsdeild kvenna, the top tier women's basketball league in Iceland. The season started on October 3, 1998 and ended on April 3, 1999. KR won its eleventh title by defeating Keflavík 3–0 in the Finals.

Competition format
The participating teams first played a conventional round-robin schedule with every team playing each opponent twice "home" and twice "away" for a total of 20 games. The top four teams qualified for the championship playoffs whilst the bottom team was relegated to Division I.

Regular season

Playoffs

Source: 2000 VÍS-deildin playoffs

References

External links
Official Icelandic Basketball Federation website

Icelandic
Lea
Úrvalsdeild kvenna seasons (basketball)